Dustin Ortiz (born December 25, 1988) is an American mixed martial artist who competes in the Flyweight division and is currently signed to the Brave CF. A professional competitor since 2010, Ortiz has also formerly competed for the UFC, RFA, Tachi Palace Fights, King of the Cage and Strikeforce.

Background
Born and raised in Franklin, Tennessee, Ortiz competed in wrestling at Franklin High School where he was a standout. After graduating, Ortiz was working in construction before being drawn to mixed martial arts.

Mixed martial arts career

Early career
Ortiz made his professional MMA debut in February 2010, fighting Lucas Thomas at GFC 6, which Ortiz won via first round submission. Ortiz then signed a contract with Strikeforce, but only fought two times with the promotion, he beat Justin Pennington and Matt Horning in his two fights with Strikeforce. Ortiz made his King of the Cage debut in August 2012. In his first fight with KOTC he beat Thiago Veiga by unanimous decision. Ortiz took a small break from MMA shortly after, but returned in January 2013, fighting at RFA 6, he beat Aaron Ely by split decision. Ortiz returned to King of the Cage in what would be his last independent fight before signing with UFC, he fought MMA veteran Mike French to a unanimous decision win.

Ultimate Fighting Championship
It was announced Ortiz would be making his debut at UFC Fight Night 27 against Justin Scoggins, but the bout was removed from the card for unknown reasons.

Ortiz instead made his debut against Jose Maria Tome at UFC Fight Night 32 in November 2013. He won the fight via TKO in the third round.

Ortiz faced John Moraga on January 15, 2014, at UFC Fight Night 35. He lost the fight via split decision.

Ortiz was expected to face Alptekin Ozkilic on April 11, 2014, at UFC Fight Night 39.  However, on April 3, the fight was cancelled due to an injury to Ozkilic.  Subsequently, Ortiz was quickly rescheduled and faced promotional newcomer Ray Borg on April 19, 2014, at UFC on Fox 11. Ortiz edged out Borg for a split decision victory.

Ortiz faced Juan Ramirez on May 7, 2014, at the World Championship, winning via Submission (armbar)

Ortiz faced Justin Scoggins on July 6, 2014, at The Ultimate Fighter 19 Finale. He won the fight via split decision.

Ortiz faced Joseph Benavidez on November 22, 2014, at UFC Fight Night 57. Ortiz lost the back-and-forth fight via unanimous decision.

A rematch with Ian McCall was expected to take place on August 8, 2015, at UFC Fight Night 73. However, McCall pulled out of the fight in late July citing injury and was replaced by Willie Gates.  Ortiz dominated the fight with his wrestling and won via TKO in the third round.

Ortiz faced Wilson Reis on January 30, 2015, at UFC on Fox 18.  He lost the fight by unanimous decision.

Ortiz next faced Jussier Formiga on September 24, 2016, at UFC Fight Night 95. He lost the fight via unanimous decision.

Ortiz faced Zach Makovsky on December 10, 2016, at UFC 206. He won the fight via split decision.

Ortiz next faced Brandon Moreno on April 22, 2017, at UFC Fight Night 108. He lost the fight via submission in the second round.

Ortiz faced Hector Sandoval on August 5, 2017, at UFC Fight Night 114. He won the fight via knockout just fifteen seconds into the first round, the fastest knockout in UFC Flyweight history. The win also earned Ortiz his first Performance of the Night bonus award.

Ortiz faced Alexandre Pantoja on January 20, 2018, at UFC 220. He won the fight by unanimous decision.

Ortiz faced Matheus Nicolau on July 28, 2018, at UFC on Fox 30. He won the fight via knockout due to a head kick and follow-up punches in the first round.

A rematch with Joseph Benavidez took place on January 19, 2019, at UFC Fight Night 143. He lost the fight via unanimous decision.

In an interview in January 2019, Henry Cejudo revealed that Ortiz was released from the UFC. In February 2019, Ortiz clarified that he was offered a release from his contract but opted to fight Benavidez as the last fight of his contract.

Post-UFC career
After his release from the UFC, Ortiz signed with the Brave CF. His first bout in the  Flyweight tournament was a Quarter-final bout against fellow UFC veteran Ali Bagautinov on April 1, 2021, at Brave CF 50. Despite keeping the bout competitive, Ortiz lost via unanimous decision.

Championships and accomplishments
Sherdog
2011 All-Violence Second Team
Ultimate Fighting Championship
Fastest knockout in UFC Flyweight history (15 seconds)
Performance of the Night (One time) vs. Hector Sandoval

Mixed martial arts record

|-
|Win
|align=center|20–9
|Dillon Tolbert
|Submission (guillotine choke)
|Valor Underground 2
|
|align=center|1
|align=center|3:01
|Nashville, Tennessee, United States
|
|-
|Loss
|align=center|19–9
|Ali Bagautinov
|Decision (unanimous)
|Brave CF 50
|
|align=center|3
|align=center|5:00
|Arad, Bahrain
|
|-
|Loss
|align=center|19–8
|Joseph Benavidez
|Decision (unanimous)
|UFC Fight Night: Cejudo vs. Dillashaw 
|
|align=center|3
|align=center|5:00
|Brooklyn, New York, United States
|
|-
|Win
|align=center|19–7
|Matheus Nicolau
|KO (head kick and punches)
|UFC on Fox: Alvarez vs. Poirier 2 
|
|align=center|1
|align=center|3:49
|Calgary, Alberta, Canada
|
|-
|Win
|align=center|18–7
|Alexandre Pantoja
|Decision (unanimous)
|UFC 220 
|
|align=center|3
|align=center|5:00
|Boston, Massachusetts, United States
|
|-
|Win
|align=center|17–7
|Hector Sandoval
|KO (punches)
|UFC Fight Night: Pettis vs. Moreno
|
|align=center|1
|align=center|0:15
|Mexico City, Mexico
|
|-
|Loss
|align=center|16–7
|Brandon Moreno
|Technical Submission (rear-naked choke)
|UFC Fight Night: Swanson vs. Lobov
|
|align=center|2
|align=center|4:06
|Nashville, Tennessee, United States
|
|-
|Win
| align=center|16–6 
| Zach Makovsky
| Decision (split)
| UFC 206
| 
| align=center|3
| align=center|5:00
| Toronto, Ontario, Canada
|
|-
| Loss
| align=center|15–6 
| Jussier Formiga
| Decision (unanimous)
| UFC Fight Night: Cyborg vs. Lansberg
| 
| align=center| 3
| align=center| 5:00
| Brasília, Brazil
|  
|-
| Loss
| align=center|15–5
| Wilson Reis
| Decision (unanimous)
| UFC on Fox: Johnson vs. Bader
| 
| align=center|3
| align=center|5:00
| Newark, New Jersey, United States
|
|-
| Win
| align=center| 15–4
| Willie Gates
| TKO (elbows and punches)
| UFC Fight Night: Teixeira vs. Saint Preux
| 
| align=center| 3
| align=center| 2:58
| Nashville, Tennessee, United States
| 
|-
| Loss
| align=center| 14–4
| Joseph Benavidez
| Decision (unanimous)
| UFC Fight Night: Edgar vs. Swanson
| 
| align=center| 3
| align=center| 5:00
| Austin, Texas, United States
| 
|-
| Win
| align=center| 14–3 
| Justin Scoggins
| Decision (split)
| The Ultimate Fighter: Team Edgar vs. Team Penn Finale
| 
| align=center| 3
| align=center| 5:00
| Las Vegas, Nevada, United States
| 
|-
| Win
| align=center| 13–3
| Ray Borg
| Decision (split)
| UFC on Fox: Werdum vs. Browne
| 
| align=center| 3
| align=center| 5:00
| Orlando, Florida, United States
| 
|-
| Loss
| align=center| 12–3
| John Moraga
| Decision (split)
| UFC Fight Night: Rockhold vs. Philippou
| 
| align=center| 3
| align=center| 5:00
| Duluth, Georgia, United States
| 
|-
| Win
| align=center| 12–2
| José Maria Tomé
| TKO (punches)
| UFC Fight Night: Belfort vs. Henderson
| 
| align=center| 3
| align=center| 3:19
| Goiânia, Brazil
| 
|-
| Win
| align=center| 11–2
| Mike French
| Decision (unanimous)
| KOTC: Train Wreck
| 
| align=center| 3
| align=center| 5:00
| Lac Du Flambeau, Wisconsin, United States
| 
|-
| Win
| align=center| 10–2
| Aaron Ely
| Decision (split)
| RFA 6
| 
| align=center| 3
| align=center| 5:00
| Kansas City, Missouri, United States
| 
|-
| Win
| align=center| 9–2
| Thiago Veiga
| Decision (unanimous)
| KOTC: Sudden Strike
| 
| align=center| 3
| align=center| 5:00
| Walker, Minnesota, United States
| 
|-
| Loss
| align=center| 8–2
| Josh Robinson
| Decision (split)
| NAFC: Colosseum
| 
| align=center| 3
| align=center| 5:00
| Milwaukee, Wisconsin, United States
| 
|-
| Win
| align=center| 8–1
| Josh Rave
| TKO (doctor stoppage)
| TPF 11: Redemption
| 
| align=center| 3
| align=center| 4:38
| Lemoore, California, United States
| 
|-
| Loss
| align=center| 7–1
| Ian McCall
| Decision (unanimous)
| TPF 9
| 
| align=center| 3
| align=center| 5:00
| Lemoore, California, United States
| 
|-
| Win
| align=center| 7–0 
| Matt Horning
| TKO (punches)
| Strikeforce Challengers: Woodley vs. Saffiedine
| 
| align=center| 3
| align=center| 2:10
| Nashville, Tennessee, United States
| 
|-
| Win
| align=center| 6–0 
| Cory Alexander
| TKO (punches)
| GFC: Gameness Fight Championship 8
| 
| align=center| 3
| align=center| 4:46
| Nashville, Tennessee, United States
| 
|-
| Win
| align=center| 5–0 
| Andrew Higgins
| TKO (punches)
| GFC: Gameness Fight Series
| 
| align=center| 2
| align=center| 3:52
| Nashville, Tennessee, United States
| 
|-
| Win
| align=center| 4–0 
| Forrest Beard
| Submission (rear-naked choke)
| GFC: Gameness Fight Championship 7
| 
| align=center| 1
| align=center| 1:28
| Nashville, Tennessee, United States
| 
|-
| Win
| align=center| 3–0 
| Lucas Thomas
| Submission (punches)
| GFC: Gameness Fight Series
| 
| align=center| 1
| align=center| 1:15
| Goodlettsville, Tennessee, United States
| 
|-
| Win
| align=center| 2–0 
| Justin Pennington
| Submission (rear-naked choke)
| Strikeforce: Nashville
| 
| align=center| 1
| align=center| 4:27
| Nashville, Tennessee, United States
| 
|-
| Win
| align=center| 1–0 
| Lucas Thomas
| Submission (arm-triangle choke)
| GFC: Gameness Fighting Championship 6
| 
| align=center| 1
| align=center| 1:00
| Nashville, Tennessee, United States
|

See also
 List of current UFC fighters
 List of male mixed martial artists

References

External links
 
 

1988 births
Living people
People from Franklin, Tennessee
American male mixed martial artists
Flyweight mixed martial artists
Mixed martial artists utilizing wrestling
Mixed martial artists utilizing Brazilian jiu-jitsu
Mixed martial artists from Tennessee
Ultimate Fighting Championship male fighters
American practitioners of Brazilian jiu-jitsu
People awarded a black belt in Brazilian jiu-jitsu